The 2009 Ms. Olympia contest 
is an IFBB professional bodybuilding competition and part of Joe Weider's Olympia Fitness & Performance Weekend 2009 was held on September 25, 2009, at the South Hall in the Las Vegas Convention Center in Winchester, Nevada and in the Orleans Arena at The Orleans Hotel and Casino in Paradise, Nevada. It was the 30th Ms. Olympia competition held. Other events at the exhibition include the 212 Olympia Showdown, Mr. Olympia, Fitness Olympia, and Figure Olympia contests.

Prize money
1st $28,000
2nd $15,000
3rd $8,000
4th $5,000
5th $3,000
6th $2,000
Total: $61,000

Results
 1st - Iris Kyle
 2nd - Heather Armbrust
 3rd - Debi Laszewski
 4th - Lisa Aukland
 5th - Yaxeni Oriquen-Garcia
 6th - Betty Pariso
 7th - Kristy Hawkins
 8th - Dayana Cadeau
 9th - Betty Viana-Adkins
 10th - Tina Chandler
 11th - Rosemary Jennings
 12th - Nicole Ball
 13th - Gale Frankie
Comparison to previous Olympia results:
Same - Iris Kyle
-12 - Heather Armbrust
Same - Lisa Aukland
-2 - Yaxeni Oriquen-Garcia
-1 - Betty Pariso
-6 - Dayana Cadeau
-7 - Betty Viana-Adkins
-4 - Rosemary Jennings
-1 - Nicole Ball

Scorecard

Attended
12th Ms. Olympia attended - Yaxeni Oriquen-Garcia
11th Ms. Olympia attended - Iris Kyle
10th Ms. Olympia attended - Dayana Cadeau
8th Ms. Olympia attended - Betty Pariso
5th Ms. Olympia attended - Lisa Aukland
4th Ms. Olympia attended - Betty Viana-Adkins and Rosemary Jennings
3rd Ms. Olympia attended - Heather Armbrust and Nicole Ball
1st Ms. Olympia attended - Debi Laszewski, Kristy Hawkins, Tina Chandler, and Gale Frankie
Previous year Olympia attendees who did not attend - Klaudia Larson, Sherry Smith, Debbie Bramwell, Brenda Raganot, Jennifer Sedia, Jeannie Paparone, Mah-Ann Mendoza, and Cathy LeFrançois

Notable events
This was Iris Kyle's 5th overall and 4th consecutive Olympia win, thus tied her with Kim Chizevsky-Nicholls with the number of consecutive Olympia wins and surpassed Kim Chizevsky-Nicholls's overall Olympia wins.
Heather Armbrust placed 2nd place this Olympia, the best placing she has ever had at the Olympia. This is also Heather Armbrust's last Olympia before her retirement from bodybuilding in 2011.
This is Lisa Aukland's last Olympia she attended before her retirement from bodybuilding in 2010.
This is Betty Pariso's, the oldest IFBB pro female bodybuilder active, last Olympia she attended before her retirement from bodybuilding in 2010. She was also the oldest IFBB pro female bodybuilder to attend a Ms. Olympia, at the age of 53 years.
This is Betty Viana-Adkins's and Rosemary Jennings's last Olympia they have attended.
The song played during the posedown was Fire Burning by Sean Kingston.

2009 Ms. Olympia Qualified

From the 2009 Atlantic City Pro:

Atlantic City, New Jersey, USA, September 12, 2009

1. Lisa Aukland, 

2. Kristy Hawkins, 

3. Nicole Ball, 

From the 2009 Tampa Pro Bodybuilding Weekly Championships:

Tampa, Florida, USA, August 8, 2009

1. Betty Pariso, 

2. Gale Frankie, 

3. Tina Chandler, 

From the 2009 New York Pro:

New York, New York, USA, May 16, 2009

1. Cathy LeFrancois, 

2. Betty Pariso, 

3. Rosemary Jennings, 

From the 2009 Ms. International:

Columbus, Ohio, USA, March 6, 2009

1. Iris Kyle, 

2. Debi Laszewski, 

3. Yaxeni Oriquen-Garcia, 

4. Heather Armbrust, 

5. Dayana Cadeau, 

6. Betty Viana-Adkins, 

7. Isabelle Turell, 

Qualifies pursuant to IFBB Pro Rule 4.5.5

From the 2008 Ms. Olympia:

Las Vegas, Nevada, USA, September 26, 2008

1. Iris Kyle, 

2. Betty Viana-Adkins, 

3. Yaxeni Oriquen-Garcia, 

4. Lisa Aukland, 

5. Dayana Cadeau, 

6. Cathy LeFrancois,

See also
 2009 Mr. Olympia

References

2009 in bodybuilding
Ms. Olympia
Ms. Olympia
History of female bodybuilding
Ms. Olympia 2009